Pectinatellidae is a family of bryozoans belonging to the order Plumatellida.

Genera:
 Afrindella Annandale, 1912
 Pectinatella Leidy, 1852

References

Bryozoan families